Terebinthus (also Terebinthus of Turbo ) was a purported pupil of Scythianus, during the 1st to 2nd century CE, according to the writings of Christian writer and anti-Manichaean polemicist Cyril of Jerusalem, and is mentioned earlier in the anonymously written, critical biography of Mani known as Acta Archelai.

Biography 

According to Cyril's anti-Manichaean works and in other Orthodox polemic, Terebinthus went to Judaea and later returned to Syria Palaestina ("becoming known and condemned" there), and ultimately settled in Babylonia. He is also said to have brought with him the books of Scythianus, which he presented upon his death to his lodger, a widow with a slave named Cubricus, who later changed his name to Mani. Mani allegedly studied the books, which thereby become the source of Manichean doctrine.

This story can be found also in Acta Archelai, an anti-manichean scripture written in Syriac language, which is ascribed to the late 4th-century AD writer Hegemonios. The story is again repeat in Lexicon Suidae (10th century) in an article dedicated to Mani. According to the Lexicon, the names of the books were: Mysterium, Evangelium, Thesaurum and Capitum (meaning "Mystery", "Gospel", "Treasury", and "Book of Chapters" respectively).

However, according to A. A. Bevan, this account "has no claim to be considered historical".

Notes

References

Bibliography 

 
 

Ancient Roman philosophers
Hellenistic philosophy and religion